Treat Conrad Huey and Travis Parrott were the defending champions, but decided not to compete.
Maxime Authom and Ruben Bemelmans won the title, defeating John Peers and John-Patrick Smith 6–4, 6–2 in the final.

Seeds

Draw

Draw

References
 Main Draw
 Qualifying Draw

Odlum Brown Vancouver Open
Vancouver Open